Maidenhead is a rural locality in the Goondiwindi Region, Queensland, Australia. It is on the Queensland border with New South Wales.

History 
The locality is named after an early pastoral run, which appears on an 1883 map.

Land in Maidenhead was open for selection on 17 April 1877;  were available.

References 

Goondiwindi Region
Localities in Queensland